The University Council for Educational Administration (UCEA) is a nonprofit, research-oriented, institutional-only member organization dedicated to improving the profession of educational administration. The organization was founded at Columbia University in the City of New York in 1954 by a group of fifteen universities concerned about the advancing the quality of educational leadership professionals and the state of the field. Today, membership includes almost 100 member schools, mostly from the United States, but also universities in Australia and Hong Kong. Many of the public universities in the Association of American Universities are also members of the UCEA. The organization is also notable for publishing the Educational Administrative Quarterly, one of the leading research journals dedicated to educational administration.

References

Educational administration